Guaxcama, also spelled Guaxcaman or Huaxcama, is a village located in the municipality of Villa Juárez, San Luis Potosí, in central Mexico.  It was a very important mining location for sulfur.  After a disastrous explosion in the 1970s, the mine was abandoned and many of its residents emigrated elsewhere including the United States of America.

History

In 1808 a German company had begun mining the area for sulfur.  Years later Mariano Niño purchased the rights to the mines.  More recently on November 18, 1972 an explosion occurred in one of the mines.  Reporter Roberto Silva, for El Sol de San Luis, advised that one was able to see the flames of the fires from the outskirts of the capital, San Luis Potosí, about 70 kilometers away.  The fire was not extinguished for days.  Astonishingly there were no deaths.  The mines are now abandoned and the adjacent buildings, including a chapel, are now in ruins.

Bibliography

Roque, Alexandro (2004) Villa Juárez, La bella villa, CNCA/Secretaría de Cultura de SLP/ Ayuntamiento de Villa Juárez

http://delmineralguaxcama.blogspot.mx/2012/11/arden-las-minas-de-guaxcama.html

Populated places in San Luis Potosí